The Sultana Bran Hockey One is a field hockey competition organised by Hockey Australia, which replaced the Australian Hockey League.

The competition serves as Australia's premier domestic hockey league, helping unearth future talent for selection to the Australian national teams; the Kookaburras and Hockeyroos.

NSW Pride are currently the most successful team with three out of four titles, with both the men's and women's sides winning the 2022 titles.

History
The Sultana Bran Hockey One was founded on 17 April 2019. The tournament was formed following an overhaul of the Australian Hockey League, and replaced the tournament to serve as Australia's premier hockey competition.

Following a series of rule innovations during the 2018 men's and women's AHL tournaments, Hockey Australia made the decision to disband the premier competition, making way for the new domestic league.

On 23 September 2019, Hockey Australia confirmed that the new league had secured a major partnership with Kellogg's, with naming rights also afforded to the company, forming the Sultana Bran Hockey One. The following day it was confirmed that Westfund Health Insurance had been named as a supporting partner.

COVID-19 pandemic
Following a successful first season of the Sultana Bran Hockey One in 2019, the second edition was anticipated for commencement in late 2020. However, due to the COVID-19 pandemic, the league's second season was postponed until 2021. The decision was made by the Hockey One board on 24 March 2020 following consultations with Hockey Australia and the seven member associations in the league, all of which being unable to financially support the program later in the year.

The postponement was not only made to benefit associations financially, but also on account of restrictions put into place by the Government of Australia, which prohibited mass-gatherings and sporting events. The league went on to postpone the second season to October 2022, owing to divergent state border restrictions in place across the country in late 2021.

Format
Seven teams will compete in a round-robin tournament with home and away matches, played from late September to mid November, with the top four teams advancing to the finals round at a pre-determined location.

Teams
The seven teams to compete in the Sultana Bran Hockey One come from Australia's states and territories, with the Northern Territory being the only team absent.

 Canberra Chill
 NSW Pride
 Brisbane Blaze
 Adelaide Fire
 Tassie Tigers
 HC Melbourne
 Perth Thundersticks

Men's tournament

Summaries

Statistics

Team Appearances

Women's tournament

Summaries

Statistics

Team Appearances

Media coverage
To promote the sport and engage fans, every match of the 2022 Hockey One League will be broadcast live across Australia. All matches will be broadcast live on Kayo Sports and in addition, all Thursday night double headers will be lives streamed on FOX Sports. Both Kayo and FOX Sports will broadcast the finals series, held over a weekend in Bendigo on the 19th and 20th of November, 2022.

See also

 Hockey Australia
 Australian Hockey League

References

 
Field hockey leagues in Australia
Professional sports leagues in Australia
2019 establishments in Australia
Sports leagues established in 2019